Yordan Yordanov (born June 9, 1981) is a Bulgarian sprint canoer who competed in the early to mid-2000s. He won a bronze medal in the K-4 1000 m event at the 2002 ICF Canoe Sprint World Championships in Seville.

Yordanov also competed in two Summer Olympics, earning his best finish of fourth in the K-4 1000 m at Athens in 2004.

References

Sports-reference.com profile
Yahoo! Sports

1981 births
Bulgarian male canoeists
Canoeists at the 2000 Summer Olympics
Canoeists at the 2004 Summer Olympics
Living people
Olympic canoeists of Bulgaria
ICF Canoe Sprint World Championships medalists in kayak